Sara Svoboda (born 3 February 1995) is a Canadian rugby union player. She plays in the Back row for Canada and Loughborough Lightning.

Rugby career 
Svoboda graduated from Centennial Secondary School. Her rugby career began with the Belleville Bulldogs minis program, she also progressed through their junior and senior ranks. She represented McMaster University in Hamilton where she was studying Kinesiology.

Svoboda competed for Canada at the delayed 2021 Rugby World Cup in New Zealand. She featured in the semifinal loss to England, and started in the third place final against France.

Personal life 
Svoboda's father, Paul, captained the Canadian Cougars rugby league team that played the USA in 1993. Her uncle Karl Svoboda played and captained Canada's Men's Team from 1985 to 1995, including at the first three Rugby World Cups. Her twin sister Katie is also capped for the senior women’s team having made her debut in 2016, while her younger sister Tia is an up-and-coming player.

References

External links 

 Sara Svoboda at Canada Rugby

Living people
1995 births
Female rugby union players
Canadian female rugby union players
Canada women's international rugby union players